Apatetrinae is a subfamily of moths in the family Gelechiidae. The subfamily was described by Edward Meyrick in 1947.

Taxonomy and systematics
Tribe Apatetrini
Apatetris Staudinger, 1880
Dactylotula Cockerell, 1888
Catatinagma Rebel, 1903
Chrysoesthia Hübner, [1825]
Coloptilia T. B. Fletcher, 1940
Epidola Staudinger, 1859
Epiphthora Meyrick, 1888
Metanarsia Staudinger, 1871
Oecocecis Guenée, 1870
Tribe Pexicopiini Hodges, 1986
Anisoplaca Meyrick, 1886
Aspades Vári in Vári & Kroon, 1986
Coleostoma Meyrick, 1922
Decatopseustis Meyrick, 1925
Epilechia Busck, 1939
Ficulea Walker, 1864
Galtica Busck, 1914
Isembola Meyrick, 1926
Lacistodes Meyrick, 1921
Leistogenes Meyrick, 1927
Macracaena Common, 1958
Mometa Durrant, 1914
Pectinophora Busck, 1917
Pexicopia Common, 1958
Phrixocrita Meyrick, 1935
Platyedra Meyrick, 1895
Porpodryas Meyrick, 1920
Semnostoma Meyrick, 1918
Sitotroga Heinemann, 1870
Syncratomorpha Meyrick, 1929
Trachyedra Meyrick, 1929
Unplaced to tribe
Acutitornus Janse, 1951
Anapatetris Janse, 1951
Autodectis Meyrick, 1937
Curvisignella Janse, 1951
Filisignella Janse, 1951
Grandipalpa Janse, 1951
Ischnophylla Janse, 1963
Lanceoptera Janse, 1960
Macrocalcara Janse, 1951
Neopatetris Janse, 1960
Radionerva Janse, 1951

References

 
Gelechiidae
Moth subfamilies